Dhuan is a collection of short stories in Urdu by Saadat Hasan Manto first published in 1941.

Background
Dhuan was first published in 1941 from Delhi. This was Manto’s third collection of original short stories after Atish Paray and Manto Ke Afsanay. It was written in Delhi during the time Manto spent in All India Radio. The collection also included reprints of Manto’s earlier stories published in Atish Paray such as Chori, Ji Aaya Sahab (Qasim) and Dewana Shair. An identical collection under the title Kali Salwar (Black Trouser) was also published in Lahore in the same year.

Content
The stories in this collection include:

 Dhuan (Smoke)
 Kabutaron wala sain (Pigeon-seller Mendicant)
 Ullu ka Pattha (Fool)
 Namukamal Tahrir (Unfinished composition)
 Qabz (Constipation)
 Aiktras ki Aankh (An Actress’s Eye)
 Woh khat jo post na kiya gaye (Those letters that were never mailed)
 Misri ki dali (A Piece of Rock Candy)
 Matami Jalsa (Assembly in Mourning)
 Talawwun (Capriciousness)
 Sijdah (Prostration)
 Taraqqi Pasand (Progressive)
 Naya Saal (New Year)
 Cuhe daan (Mousetrap)
 Chori (Thief) 
 Qasim (Qasim) 
 Dewana Shair
 Kali Salwar (Black Trouser)
 Lalten (Laltern)
 Intezar (Wait)
 Phoolon ki sajis (The Flowers’ Conspiracy)
 Garam Sut (Warm Suit)
 Mera Hamsafar (My Fellow Traveller)
 Paresaani ka sabab (The Reason for Worry)

Themes
Dhuan (Smoke), from which the collection takes its title, was first published in the Urdu magazine Saqi. The story deals with the awakening of sexual urges in a twelve-year old boy, Masud. In Cuhe daan (Mousetrap), Manto depicts the early discovery of romantic love by teenages.

Lalten (Laltern),  Misri ki dali (A Piece of Rock Candy) and Namukamal Tahrir (Unfinished composition) are similar tales of attraction of a vacationing young man for a young mountain girl.

Manto explores political issues in Matami Jalsa (Assembly in Mourning) which is a satire on the reaction of people to the news of the death of Mustafa Kemal Atatürk. The story describes an assembly of people gathered to honour Ataturk following his death. Taraqqi Pasand (Progressive), based by a true incident involving Rajinder Singh Bedi and Devindra Satyarthi, is a friendly ribbing on the Progressive Writers' Movement to which Manto was associated.

He touches on social realism in Kali Salwar (Black Trouser) through the character of Sultana, a prostitute whose business is falling. First published in Adab-i-Latif in Lahore, it was banned by the British government under section 292 of the Indian Penal Code on grounds of obscenity.

Aiktras ki Aankh (An Actress’s Eye), Qabz (Constipation) and Paresaani ka sabab (The Reason for Worry) are sketches on the people of the Bombay film industry.

See also
Kali Salwar - a movie based on Manto’s story of the same name

Notes

References

Cited sources

Indian short stories
1941 short story collections
Urdu-language books
Saadat Hasan Manto